Galtieri is an Italian surname. Notable people with the surname include:
Francesco Galtieri, songwriter for multinational crossover vocal group Il Divo
Lina Galtieri (born 1934), Italian-American physicist
Leopoldo Galtieri (1926–2003), Argentine general and military dictator

Italian-language surnames